The Lone Wolf is an American television series that aired in 1954. Louis Hayward starred as Michael Lanyard, the Lone Wolf. It ran for 39 episodes.

Hayward signed to make the series in September 1953. The producers were Jack Gross and Phil Krasne, for United Television.

The budget was $35,000 an episode.

References

External links

The Long Wolf at CTVA

1954 American television series debuts
1955 American television series endings
English-language television shows